Eva Wilms (born 28 July 1952 in Essen, North Rhine-Westphalia) is a retired West German shot putter.

Her personal best throw was 21.43 metres, achieved in June 1977 in Munich. This places her sixth on the German all-time list, behind Ilona Slupianek, Claudia Losch, Marianne Adam, Margitta Droese and Ines Müller.

She competed for the sports clubs ESV Neuaubing and LAC Quelle Fürth during her active career.

Achievements

In fact Eva Wilms is a pentathlete. She set 2 world records in 1977. The following are her lists of performances in different events:
Pentathlon [100mH, SP, HJ, LJ, 200m]: 4932p/1976 [including 20.94m SP and 23.9s 200m]
Pentathlon [100mH, SP, HJ, LJ, 800m]: 4823p,former WR/1977-13.83s-20.95m-1.74m-6.29m-2.19.66s
JV: 48,74m 1 Eva Wilms (20.07.52) 180/76 Sport Union Annen 03.09.73 Witten
SP: 21.43m Eva Wilms FRG 28.07.52 2 Munich 
DT:59,42m 1 Eva Wilms (28.7.52) 180/83 LAC Quelle Fürth By 21.06.80 Garmisch-Partenkirchen
LJ:6.29m 5K Eva Wilms (28.7.52) 180/83 LAC Quelle Fürth By 19.06.77 Bernhausen
200M: 23,9s (5K) Eva Wilms (28.7.52) 180/83 ESV Neuaubing By 05/09/76 Hannover
100MH:13,70s 5K Eva Wilms (28.7.52) 180/83 LAC Quelle Fürth By 14.05.77 Göttingen

References

1952 births
Living people
Sportspeople from Essen
West German female shot putters
Athletes (track and field) at the 1976 Summer Olympics
Olympic athletes of West Germany